William Henry Hickton (28 August 1884 – 8 April 1942) was an English first-class cricketer who played in five matches for Worcestershire in the space of little over a month in 1909. He took only two wickets: those of Warwickshire's Charles Baker and Middlesex's Harold Wyatt.

Hickton was born in Lower Broughton, Salford, Lancashire; he died in Leeds, West Riding of Yorkshire at the age of 58.

His father, also named William, had a longer first-class career, playing 60 games in the 1860s and 1870s.

External links
 

1884 births
1942 deaths
English cricketers
Worcestershire cricketers
People from Broughton, Greater Manchester
Northumberland cricketers